Genovesa Island (Spanish: Isla Genovesa), referred to in English as Tower Island, is a shield volcano in the Galápagos Islands in the eastern Pacific Ocean. The horse-shoe shaped island has a volcanic caldera whose wall has collapsed, forming the Great Darwin Bay, surrounded by cliffs. Lake Arcturus, filled with salt water, lies in the centre, and sediment within this crater lake is less than 6,000 years old. Although no historical eruptions are known from Genovesa, there are very young lava flows on the flanks of the volcano.

The official Spanish name "Genovesa" is from the Italian city of Genoa, in honor of Christopher Columbus. The English name "Tower" is presumably a corruption of "Downes". The island's position was reported by John Downes of the USS Essex in 1813, during the War of 1812, and the name "Dowers's" appeared in 1815, presumably a misspelled reference to Downes. After passing through "Dowers's", "Dowers", and "Tower's", by 1841 it was written as "Tower" in the British Admiralty chart.

Wildlife 
This island is known as Bird Island, because of the large and varied bird colonies which nest here. There are an abundance of frigatebirds and it is among the best place in the archipelago to see red-footed boobies, Nazca boobies, swallow-tailed gulls, storm petrels, tropicbirds, Darwin's finches, and Galápagos mockingbirds.

At the top, the trail continues inland, passing more seabird colonies in a thin palo santo forest. The trail also provides overviews of a rocky plain. Storm petrels here are different from any others in the world because they are active during the day. To avoid predators, they only return to their nest holes at night.

The smallest marine iguana in the archipelago lives here.

Recreation
In Darwin Bay there is the possibility to either dive along the inner wall or go to the outer wall, which is less protected. Another possibility is to dive from the outside of the volcano through the channel into the caldera.

See also
 List of volcanoes in Ecuador

References

External links
 Images from Genovesa 

Islands of the Galápagos Islands
Seabird colonies
Shield volcanoes of Ecuador
Calderas of the Galápagos Islands
Volcanic crater lakes
Polygenetic shield volcanoes